Bithlo is a census-designated place and an unincorporated community in Orange County, Florida, United States. The population was 8,268 at the 2010 census, up from 4,626 at the 2000 census. It is part of the Orlando–Kissimmee Metropolitan Statistical Area.

The Bithlo Post Office opened in 1922. For 20 years in the early 20th century, Bithlo was an incorporated town, but in 1929 ceased to function as a town due to economic hardship. By 1941, the town council meetings had ended and in 1944 the Okeechobee Railroad Branch was abandoned. After the end of World War II, the town became known as a waste dump and pollution site. It was in 1970 when the residents of Bithlo petitioned the state legislature to revoke the town's charter. The city was finally unincorporated in 1977, an act which was not finalized until 1982 due to outstanding bonds and legal problems.

Bithlo is the location of several of the broadcasting towers for the digital television stations in the Orlando-Daytona Beach-Melbourne market. It is also home to Bithlo Park and the East Orange Babe Ruth youth baseball and softball program, one of the premier youth baseball and softball programs in Central Florida.

Geography
Bithlo is located at  (28.5525, -81.1058).

According to the United States Census Bureau, the CDP has a total area of 28.2 km2 (10.9 mi2).  27.6 km2 (10.7 mi2) of it is land and 0.5 km2 (0.2 mi2) of it (1.84%) is water.

Name origin
"Bithlo" derives from the Muskogee word pilo ("canoe").  The  represents a lateral fricative  which was often transcribed . The unaspirated  of Muskogee is acoustically as similar to English voiced and unaspirated  as to English voiceless and aspirated .

Demographics

As of the census of 2000, there were 4,626 people, 1,651 households, and 1,177 families residing in the CDP.  The population density was 167.4/km2 (433.5/mi2).  There were 1,829 housing units at an average density of 66.2/km2 (171.4/mi2).  The racial makeup of the CDP was 93.36% White, 0.99% African American, 0.91% Native American, 0.35% Asian, 0.04% Pacific Islander, 2.14% from other races, and 2.20% from two or more races. Hispanic or Latino of any race were 9.32% of the population.

There were 1,651 households, out of which 35.8% had children under the age of 18 living with them, 48.5% were married couples living together, 13.6% had a female householder with no husband present, and 28.7% were non-families. 19.0% of all households were made up of individuals, and 5.0% had someone living alone who was 65 years of age or older.  The average household size was 2.80 and the average family size was 3.16.

In the CDP, the population was spread out, with 27.9% under the age of 18, 9.9% from 18 to 24, 30.9% from 25 to 44, 22.9% from 45 to 64, and 8.4% who were 65 years of age or older.  The median age was 34 years. For every 100 females, there were 106.7 males.  For every 100 females age 18 and over, there were 107.3 males.

The median income for a household in the CDP was $34,530, and the median income for a family was $34,425. Males had a median income of $27,894 versus $17,250 for females. The per capita income for the CDP was $13,867.  About 16.9% of families and 21.5% of the population were below the poverty line, including 28.6% of those under age 18 and 9.2% of those age 65 or over.

References

External links
How Do You Transform a Community After a Century of Neglect? at Robert Wood Johnson Foundation
East Orange Babe Ruth

Unincorporated communities in Orange County, Florida
Census-designated places in Orange County, Florida
Greater Orlando
Census-designated places in Florida
Unincorporated communities in Florida
Former municipalities in Florida
Populated places disestablished in 1977